Marie-Christine Lê-Huu is a Canadian actress and playwright from Quebec. She is most noted for her stage play Jouliks, which was a shortlisted nominee for the Governor General's Award for French-language drama at the 2005 Governor General's Awards and was adapted into a feature film by director Mariloup Wolfe in 2019.

Born and raised in Quebec City as the daughter of a Vietnamese immigrant father and a Québécoise mother, she is a graduate of the Conservatoire de musique et d'art dramatique du Québec. In addition to Jouliks, her other theatrical plays have included Faust, pantin du diable (1995), Les Enrobantes (1998), Chambres (1999), Les Disparus, chroniques de la cruauté (2002), Imago (2004), Une forêt dans la tête (2007), Le Voyage (2009), Ma mère est un poisson rouge (2014) and Je cherche une maison qui vous ressemble (2018).

As an actress she has been associated primarily with stage roles, although she has also performed in the television series Scoop (1995), 4 et demi... (1995), Cornemuse (1999), Toc Toc Toc (2007) and Victor Lessard (2017), and the films Polygraph (1996) and Les mots gelés (2009).

She is currently an acting teacher at the National Theatre School of Canada.

References

External links

Canadian film actresses
Canadian stage actresses
Canadian television actresses
Canadian women dramatists and playwrights
Canadian women screenwriters
Canadian screenwriters in French
Canadian dramatists and playwrights in French
Canadian people of Vietnamese descent
Canadian writers of Asian descent
Actresses from Quebec City
Writers from Quebec City
French Quebecers
Living people
20th-century Canadian actresses
20th-century Canadian dramatists and playwrights
20th-century Canadian women writers
21st-century Canadian actresses
21st-century Canadian dramatists and playwrights
21st-century Canadian women writers
21st-century Canadian screenwriters
Year of birth missing (living people)